Zhytomyrska is a Kyiv Metro station on Sviatoshynsko-Brovarska Line. The station was opened on 24 May 2003 as part of the westward extension of the Sviatoshynsky radius along with its neighbour Akademmistechko.

Designed by the architects V.Gnevyshev, T.Tselikovskaya and N.Aleshkin, the station was the first on the line to be built to a single-vault design "walls in earth", i.e. where the walls of the station pit are incorporated into the design, and the main vault rests on top of them, thus saving time and resources for construction.

In its decoration, marble is used on the walls (white and red) and on the floor. Lighting comes from suspended fluorescent tubes, and the station features catamaran-style rises on the walls where the station name is displayed.

Presently the station is the most westwards on the main Peremohy Avenue, and is only a few kilometres from Kyiv's circular motorway separating the city and Kyiv Oblast. The avenue then becomes the M17 (E40) intercity motorway and continues westwards into Western Ukraine including the city of Zhytomyr (for which the station is named). As a result, it receives a moderate passenger traffic from the regional areas.

As of the events during the 2022 Russian invasion of Ukraine, this station is not operated and used as a bomb shell place.

External links
 Metropoliten.kyiv.ua – Station description
 Mirmetro.net - Station at "Metroworld" page
 Metro.zarohem.cz – Photo gallery

Kyiv Metro stations
Railway stations opened in 2003
2003 establishments in Ukraine